The geography of the U.S. State of Colorado is diverse, encompassing both rugged mountainous terrain, vast plains, desert lands, desert canyons, and mesas. Colorado is a landlocked U.S. state. In 1861, the United States Congress defined the boundaries of the new Territory of Colorado exclusively by lines of latitude and longitude, stretching from 37°N to 41°N latitude, and from 102°02'48"W to 109°02'48"W longitude (25°W to 32°W from the Washington Meridian). Starting in 1868, official surveys demarcated the boundaries,  deviating from the parallels and meridians in several places. Later surveys attempted to correct some of these mistakes but in 1925 the U.S. Supreme Court affirmed that the earlier demarcation was the official boundary. The borders of Colorado are now officially defined by 697 boundary markers connected by straight boundary lines.  Colorado, Wyoming, and Utah are the only states that have their borders defined solely by straight boundary lines with no natural features.  The southwest corner of Colorado is the Four Corners Monument at 36°59'56"N, 109°2'43"W.  This is the only place in the United States where four states meet: Colorado, New Mexico, Arizona, and Utah.

The summit of Mount Elbert at  elevation in Lake County is the state's highest point and the highest point in the Rocky Mountains of North America. Colorado has approximately 550 mountain peaks that exceed  elevation. Colorado is the only U.S. state that lies entirely above  elevation.

As is common in mountainous and adjacent areas, microclimates exist and weather is strongly influenced by orography. A notable regional atmospheric phenomenon is the Denver Convergence Vorticity Zone (DCVZ) and related Denver Cyclone occurring on the High Plains just east of Denver. The Rocky Mountains as a whole induce significant changes in weather afar, such as the Colorado low.

Regions

The Midwest states of Kansas and Nebraska border Colorado to the east and northeast.

The plains are sparsely settled with most population along the South Platte and the Arkansas rivers. Rainfall is meager, averaging about  annually. There is some irrigated farming, but much of the land is used for dryland farming or ranching. Winter wheat is a typical crop and most small towns in the region boast both a water tower and a grain elevator.

The bulk of Colorado's population lives along the eastern edge of the Rocky Mountains in the Front Range Urban Corridor. This region is partially protected from prevailing storms by the high mountains to the west.

To the west lies the eastern slope of the Rocky Mountains with notable peaks such as Longs Peak, Mount Evans, Pikes Peak, and the Spanish Peaks near Walsenburg in the south. This area drains to the east, is forested, and partially urbanized. With urbanization, utilization of the forest for timbering and grazing resulted in accumulation of fuel. During the drought of 2002 devastating forest fires swept this area.

The Continental Divide stretches along the crest of the Rocky Mountains. To the west of the Continental Divide is the Western Slope. Water west of the Continental Divide drains west into the Pacific Ocean via the Colorado River. Western Colorado is made up of mountains, mesas, desert canyons, and desert lands.

Within the interior of the Rocky Mountains are several large parks or high broad basins. In the north, on the east side of the Continental Divide is North Park. North Park is drained by the North Platte River, which flows north into the northwest state of Wyoming. Just south but on the west side of the Continental Divide is Middle Park, drained by the Colorado River. South Park is the headwaters of the South Platte River. To the south lies the San Luis Valley, the headwaters of the Rio Grande, which drains into New Mexico. Across the Sangre de Cristo Range to the east of the San Luis Valley lies the Wet Mountain Valley. These basins, particularly the San Luis Valley, lie along the Rio Grande Rift, a major tectonic feature. See Rift.

The Rockies are snow-covered only in the winter; most snow melts by mid-August with the exception of a few small glaciers. The Colorado Mineral Belt, stretching from the San Juan Mountains in the southwest to Boulder and Central City on the front range, contains most of the historic gold and silver mining districts of Colorado.

The Western Slope is generally drained by the Colorado River and its tributaries. Notable to the south are the San Juan Mountains, an extremely rugged mountain range, and to the west of the San Juans, the Colorado Plateau, a high desert extending into neighboring states. Grand Junction is the largest city on the Western Slope. Grand Junction is served by Interstate Highway 70. To the southeast of Grand Junction is Grand Mesa, a large flat-topped desert mountain. Further east are the ski resort communities of Aspen, Vail, Crested Butte, and Steamboat Springs. The northwestern corner of Colorado bordering Northern Utah and Western Wyoming is mostly sparsely populated rangeland.

From west to east, the state consists of desert basins, desert canyons and mesas, turning into desert plateaus, then alpine mountains, and then the grasslands of the High Plains. Mount Elbert is the highest peak in the Rocky Mountains of North America. The famous Pikes Peak is just west of Colorado Springs. Its lone peak is visible from near the Kansas border on clear days.

Climate statistics for selected cities

See also

 Index of Colorado-related articles
 Colorado geographic regions
 Southern Rocky Mountains
 List of cities and towns in Colorado
 List of Colorado fourteeners
 List of counties in Colorado
 List of drainage basins of Colorado
 List of mountain passes in Colorado
 List of mountain peaks of Colorado
 List of mountain peaks of the Rocky Mountains
 List of mountain ranges of Colorado
 List of rivers of Colorado
 List of waterfalls of Colorado

Notes

References

External links
 State of Colorado website
 Geography of Colorado